DriverX is a 2017 American drama film directed by Henry Barrial, starring Patrick Fabian.

Cast
 Patrick Fabian as Leonard Moore
 Tanya Clarke as Dawn Moore
 Desmin Borges as Tom
 Travis Schuldt as Harry
 Melissa Fumero as Jessica
 Oscar Nunez as Julio
 Nina Seničar as Nina
 Max Gail as Danny
 Iqbal Theba as Distinguished Man
 Randall Batinkoff as Ryan
 Heather Ankeny as Jackie

Release
The film was released in theatres on 30 November 2018.

Reception
Dan Buffa of KSDK wrote that the film "shines a much-needed light on a profession that's not as easy as it looks" and is "far more interesting" than he initially thought it would be. Ben Kenigsberg of The New York Times wrote that while the film is "not perfect" and features "one wild night too many", its outlook "lingers". Noel Murray of the Los Angeles Times wrote that while the film 
is a "little reductive when it comes to the generation gap", the performances are "excellent" and Barrial "isn’t playing Leonard’s predicament for cheap laughs or amped-up drama".

Frank Scheck of The Hollywood Reporter wrote that the film "has the style but not the substance of a strong ’70s indie drama, stalls out quickly and goes nowhere interesting." Nick Allen of RogerEbert.com gave the film a "thumbs down" and wrote that it is "selling a lifestyle of working for billion-dollar rideshare companies, masquerading as a light-hearted indie when it has the soul of a commercial."

References

External links
 
 

American drama films
2017 drama films